Frederick Crowder may refer to:

 Petre Crowder (Frederick Petre Crowder, 1919–1999), British politician
 Frederick Crowder (cricketer, born 1798) (1798–1894), English cricketer
 Frederick Crowder (cricketer, born 1845) (1845–1938), English cricketer and tennis player
 Frederick Crowder (politician) (1850–1902), Western Australian politician